Adolphe Alphonse Allard (5 February 1857 - 24 September 1923) was a Belgian politician. He was a member of the Chamber of Representatives.

Lifetime 

Allard was a teacher. He became elected councilor of Braine in 1895. In 1900 he was elected member of parliament and continued to exercise this office until his death. Brakel has an Avenue Adolphe Allard.

Works 

Désarmement, Brussel, 1890
Le Juif Errant, Gent, 1905
Le Catéchisme des ouvriers du bâtiment, Gent, 1909

References
 Paul VAN MOLLE, Het Belgisch parlement, 1894-1972, Antwerp, 1972

Members of the Chamber of Representatives (Belgium)
1857 births
1923 deaths